Christopher Gores is a Puerto Rican soccer player who plays for Gigantes de Carolina FC in the Puerto Rico Soccer League.  He has also appeared for the Puerto Rico national football team.

Career
Gores attended St. Paul Academy and Summit School and lead the school to a Minnesota state championship in his junior year.  He later attended Stanford University to play his college career. Gores also played for the Charleston Battery of the USL First Division and Sevilla FC Puerto Rico of the Puerto Rico Soccer League, helping the team win the first ever league title.

External links

1977 births
Living people
Puerto Rican footballers
Sevilla FC Puerto Rico players
Puerto Rico international footballers
Charleston Battery players
USL First Division players
Association football defenders